The North Downs Way National Trail is a long-distance path in southern England, opened in 1978.  It runs from Farnham to Dover, past Guildford, Dorking, Merstham, Otford and Rochester, along the Surrey Hills Area of Outstanding Natural Beauty (AONB) and Kent Downs AONB.

History
Planning for a new Long Distance Path, as they were classified in 1949, began in Kent in 1950.  After an extensive survey, it was agreed that a route on "a line which offers the best scenic qualities for the walker" along the ridge of the North Downs, rather than the Pilgrim's Way (which even in the 1960s was predominantly metalled road), was preferred.  Working alongside Surrey County Council, plans were eventually submitted in 1966.
The North Downs Way was officially designated by the then Minister of Housing and Local Government, Anthony Greenwood, on 14 July 1969, and opened in parts shortly afterwards, becoming fully open in 1978.

Route

East of Boughton Lees, the path splits in two, the northern section running via Canterbury and the southern via Wye; at this stage the path crosses the Stour Valley Walk and passes the Wye Crown. The two sections of the path reunite at Dover. The official guide to the trail divides the North Downs Way into fifteen sections.

The pathway is mixed-category in that it varies throughout length from footpath (around 48 percent) status to bridleway, byway and road. Some 19 percent of the Way follows roads, though 75 percent of those are minor lanes.

The path (east of Boughton Lees, the southern section) runs along the ridge of the North Downs hills, and follows parts of the Pilgrims' Way.

Geology

As the pathway runs through the higher parts of the downland, the trail and surrounding countryside are characterised by chalk-based soil and calcareous grassland with broadleaf woodland on the upper slopes. It reflects the underlying sedimentary chalk deposits on the highest parts of the trail. There is livestock grazing on the lower slopes with clay soil and crop agriculture predominant in the valleys.

See also
 Long-distance footpaths in the United Kingdom
 Hollingbourne Downs
 South Downs Way

References

External links

North Downs Way National Trail website
Photos of the North Downs Way on geograph.org.uk
Map of the North Downs way in two mile sections

Footpaths in Surrey
Footpaths in Kent
Long-distance footpaths in England